Zaraasuchus ("hedgehog crocodile") was a gobiosuchid crocodyliform described in 2004 by Diego Pol and Mark Norell. It was found in the Red Beds of Zos Canyon, in the Gobi Desert of Mongolia, thus making it Late Cretaceous in age.

The type species is Z. shepardi, honouring Dr. Richard Shepard.

Material 

The holotype of Z. shepardi is IGM 100/1321, consisting of the posterior region of the skull and lower jaws with articulation with cervical vertebrae, forelimb elements and osteoderms.

Systematics 

Pol and Norell (2004) found Zaraasuchus shepardi to be the sister taxon of Gobiosuchus kielanae, united by 14 synapomorphies, primarily from the skull, forming the family Gobiosuchidae.

Sources 

 Pol, D. & Norell, M. A., (2004). "A new gobiosuchid crocodyliform taxon from the Cretaceous of Mongolia". American Museum Novitates 3458: 1-31.

Late Cretaceous crocodylomorphs of Asia
Terrestrial crocodylomorphs
Late Cretaceous reptiles of Asia
Fossils of Mongolia
Prehistoric pseudosuchian genera